Rasmus Nielsen (1809, Roerslev, Funen–1884) was a Danish philosopher and professor, as well as a critic of Søren Kierkegaard.

Nielsen was the son of a farmer. He studied theology at the University of Copenhagen, starting in 1832 and graduating in 1837. He then went on to get a licentiate degree and, after giving some lectures on theological topics, succeeded Poul Martin Møller as professor of moral theology.

Bibliography 

 Philosophical Propadeutic
 The Logic of Basic Concepts or The Logic of Fundamental Ideas, 1864
 The Philosophy of Religion, 1869

References 

1809 births
1884 deaths
Danish philosophers